Ken Christie (28 August 1927 – 17 August 2017) was an Australian rules footballer who played with Melbourne in the Victorian Football League (VFL) during the early 1950s.

Echuca recruit Ken Christie was a utility player, seen mostly in the ruck and resting in defence. He was one of six debutantes for Melbourne in the opening game of the 1951 season, the most notable of those being John Beckwith. Melbourne would have a poor year and Christie, who played in ten of their games, failed to experience a win. He was part of team success in 1954 and played in their Grand Final side which went down to Footscray.

References

External links

Holmesby, Russell and Main, Jim (2007). The Encyclopedia of AFL Footballers. 7th ed. Melbourne: Bas Publishing.

1927 births
2017 deaths
Australian rules footballers from Victoria (Australia)
Melbourne Football Club players
Echuca Football Club players